Seok may refer to:

Seok (clan), clan among the Turkic-speaking people 
Seok (Korean name), Korean surname and given names
Seok Pass, a mountain pass in Kyrgyzstan